Place Saint Sulpice is a large public square, dominated on its eastern side by the Church of Saint-Sulpice. It was built in 1754 as a tranquil garden in the Latin Quarter of the 6th arrondissement of Paris.

Features
In addition to the church, the square features the Fontaine Saint-Sulpice, or Fountain of the Four Bishops (Fontaine des Quatre Evêques), built in the center of the square between 1844 and 1848, was designed by the architect Joachim Visconti. The fountain presents the statues of four bishops, one on each of its sides:
 Bossuet, North, statue by Jean-Jacques Feuchère
 Fénelon, East, statue by François Lanno
 Fléchier, West, statue by Louis Desprez
 Massillon, South, statue by Jacques-Auguste Fauginet
Some people call this monumental fountain the fontaine des quatre points cardinaux (lit. the "Fountain of the Four Cardinal Points"). This is a bit of innocent wordplay; none of the four esteemed bishops ever became a cardinal.

Other features include chestnut trees that produce pink flowers in season, the city hall of the 6th arrondissement, and the Café de la Mairie, a rendezvous for writers and students which featured in the 1990 film, La Discrète ("The Discreet"), directed by Christian Vincent, starring Fabrice Luchini and Judith Henry.

Metro stations

The square is served by lines 4 and 10.

Gallery

External links 
 
 Place Saint-Sulpice (mairie de Paris)

Saint-Sulpice
Buildings and structures in the 6th arrondissement of Paris